Joško Čagalj (born 15 February 1972), better known under his stage name Jole, is a Croatian pop singer.

He married his wife Ana in 2006, and has three daughters and a one son with her. Although he was born in Heilbronn, he spent his childhood in Zagvozd, his father's birthplace and later moved to Split.

Discography

Studio albums
 Jednina i množina (1999)
 Sve su žene lijepe (2001)
 Otključano! (2004)
 Retrorama (2005)
 Odijelo (2009)
 Remek djelo (2014)
 Pijanica nisam (2015)

Compilations
 Zlatna kolekcija (2007)

References

External links
 Jole 

1972 births
Living people
Croatian pop singers
20th-century Croatian male singers
People from Zagvozd
21st-century Croatian male singers